On 16 August 2022, the Turkish Air Force targeted a Syrian Army military base near the town of Kobanî, killing at least 13 Syrian government soldiers. The airstrikes were allegedly launched in response to the killing of a Turkish Army soldier in the town of Karkamış by the Syrian Democratic Forces earlier in the day.

References

2022 in the Syrian civil war
2022 airstrikes
Airstrikes during the Syrian civil war
Aleppo Governorate in the Syrian civil war
Attacks on buildings and structures in Syria
Military operations of the Syrian civil war in 2022
Turkish involvement in the Syrian civil war